Vladimir Mikhaylovich Aseev (born 19 June 1951) is a Russian politician and member of the State Duma of the Russian Federation.

Biography 
He was born on June 19, 1951 in the village of Plotnikovo, Kemerovo Region .

Education and employment 
He graduated from the Novosibirsk Institute of Railway Engineers as a civil engineer in 1974. He began his career as a machine worker at a nitrogen-fertilizer plant in the city of Kemerovo (1966–1969).

From 1974 to 1976 as a conscript of the Soviet Army, he worked on the construction of the Baikal-Amur Mainline. From 1976 to 1982  he was master, foreman, chief engineer of the site, head of the site in the building and assembly department of the Sibakademstroy trust (Belokurikha, Altai Krai). In 1982 and 1983  he was the section chief and from 1983- 1987 he was chief engineer of construction management in Langepas.

From 1987 to 1991 he was the first deputy chairman, then the chairman of the executive committee of the Langepas City Council. From 1991 to 1996 - Mayor of Langepas. From 1996 to 2000 - the head of the local self-government of Langepas. In 2000-2002 - first deputy chairman of the Government of Khanty-Mansi Autonomous Okrug. Aseev supervised the construction, housing and transport.

On 24 March 2002, Aseev was elected member of the 3rd State Duma of Russia in the by-election in the Nizhnevartovsk constituency No. 221. Reelected in 2003 and 2007.

Awards and titles 

 honorary worker of the housing and utilities sector of Russia
 Medal of the Order of Merit for the Fatherland, I degree
 Medal of the Order of Merit for the Fatherland, II degree

Family 
He is married and has a son and a daughter.

References 

Living people
1951 births
United Russia politicians
21st-century Russian politicians
People from Kemerovo Oblast
Mayors of places in Russia
Third convocation members of the State Duma (Russian Federation)
Fourth convocation members of the State Duma (Russian Federation)
Fifth convocation members of the State Duma (Russian Federation)